Thollander is a Swedish surname. Notable people with the surname include:

Earl Thollander, artist
Gunnar Thollander, member of the parliament of Sweden
Jonathan Thollander, professional ice hockey player
David Thollander, Vice President of Muvico Theaters

Swedish-language surnames